Martijn Nuijens (born 18 November 1983) is a Dutch former track and field athlete who competed in the high jump. He is a three-time Dutch national high jump champion, having won in 2007, 2009 and 2010. His was a member of the Phanos track club. He is 1.94 m tall. His personal best for the event is  set in 2009.

He also competed in qualifying rounds only at the European Athletics Indoor Championships in 2007 and 2009, as well as the 2010 European Athletics Championships.

International competitions

National titles
Dutch Athletics Championships
High jump: 2007, 2009, 2010

References

External links

1983 births
Living people
Dutch male high jumpers
People from Den Helder
World Athletics Championships athletes for the Netherlands
Sportspeople from North Holland
21st-century Dutch people